Oreste Candi (27 November 1865 – 4 September 1938) was an Italian luthier.

Candi was born in Minerbio near Bologna.  He was the older brother of Cesare Candi, and was the first of the two brothers to apprentice under Raffaele Fiorini (in Bologna). He later moved to work in Genoa.

In 1886, he was already an employee of the Barberis brothers. Then, in the last decade of the 19th century, he dedicated himself to the construction of mandolins and guitars with his younger brother Cesare in their own violin making workshop in via dei Servi 54.

From the 1900s to 1930, Oreste had  a workshop at Vico di Ponticello.  He began making stringed instruments at a relatively late age; the construction of violins before 1915 was sporadic.

'The most interesting of his works were inspired by the Genova school of the 18th Century which he probably knew from originals and also copies left from Erminio Montefiori.'

Mention must be made of Oreste Candi's only pupil, Lorenzo Bellafontana, whose production of bowed instruments is not consistent, interspersed as it is with many guitars and repair works, but is nonetheless interesting for the changes in style that those instruments show. During the 1950s he made a fair number of ‘Cannon’ violins in the style of Praga that sometimes bear original labels. Evidently the tradition of violin making in Genoa continued unbroken.
The single factor that is consistent with modern times and the past is a dark violin that for around 150 years has lain in the city's town hall: Paganini's ‘Cannon’ is the true thread, the obligatory reference point not only for every maker who has considered this violin as a starting point, but also for those makers (like Cesare Candi) who respectfully kept their distance.

In 1936, two years before he died at Genova, Candi made his one and only double bass. The label reads "#122, Oreste Candi, fece in Genvoa, l'anno 1936. This is the one and only Candi Bass; http://www.kensmithbasses.com/doublebasses/Candi/Candi.html

Biography
Blot, Eric (1994). "Liguria III", Un secolo di liuteria italiana, 1860-1960 - A century of Italian violin making. Cremona: Turris. . 
La Liuteria Italiana / Italian Violin Making in the 1800s and 1900s - Umberto Azzolina
I Maestri Del Novicento - Carlo Vettori
La Liuteria Lombarda del '900 - Roberto Codazzi, Cinzia Manfredini 2002
Dictionary of 20th Century Italian Violin Makers - Marlin Brinser 1978
Vannes, Rene [1951] (1985). Dictionnaire Universel del Luthiers (vol.3). Bruxelles: Les Amis de la musique. OCLC 53749830. 
William, Henley (1969). Universal Dictionary of Violin & Bow Makers. Brighton; England: Amati. .

External links
 https://web.archive.org/web/20081203140953/http://www.giordanoviolins.com/english/articles/genoeseline.html
 Il Suono Di Bologna 2002 - Biographies of the Makers on Display in December at www.ilsuonodibologna.org

References 

1865 births
1938 deaths
Italian luthiers